The Croall Lectures are a lecture series in Christian theology given in Edinburgh, and founded in 1875. The Lectures were endowed by John Croall of Southfield, who died in 1871.

Lecturers
1876 John Tulloch
1878–79 John Caird, Philosophy of Religion
1879–80 William Milligan, The Resurrection of Our Lord
1882 Archibald Hamilton Charteris, The New Testament Scriptures: their claims, history, and authority
1885 John Cunningham, The Growth of the Church
1887 Robert Flint, Agnosticism
1889 Archibald Scott, Buddhism and Christianity; a Parallel and a Contrast
1892 William Hastie, The Theology of the Reformed Church
1893–94 James Robertson, Poetry and Religion of the Psalms
1897 Thomas Nicol, Recent Archaeology and the Bible
1899 Rev Prof John Patrick (Professor of Biblical Criticism), Clement of Alexandria
1901–02 Alexander Stewart, Creeds and Churches: Studies in Symbolics
1903–04 William Straton Bruce, Social Aspects of Christian Morality
1907–08 Andrew Wallace Williamson, The Person of Christ in the Faith of the Church
1911–12 George Milligan, The New Testament Documents, their origin and early history 
1912–13 Andrew Blair Wann, The Message of Christ to India
1913? James Nicoll Ogilvie
1914 Archibald Robert Stirling Kennedy
1916 James Cooper
1918–19 William Leslie Davidson, Recent Theistic Discussion
1920–21 Rev Prof William Alexander Curtis<ref>Alexander Morrison Ferguson Macinnes, The Kingdom of God in the Apostolic Writings ([1924]) p. 239; archive.org.</ref>'
1923 David Miller Kay, The Semitic Religions1925 H. M. B. Reid, The Holy Spirit and the Mystics1926–27 Henry Johnstone Wotherspoon, Religious Values in the Sacraments1928 J. Garrow Duncan, Digging Up Biblical History. Recent Archaeology In Palestine And Its Bearing On The Old Testament1930–31, Alexander Hetherwick, The Gospel and the African1933 Hugh Ross Mackintosh, Types of Modern Theology, Schleiermacher to Barth1936 Otto Piper, God in History1937 George Simpson Duncan, Jesus, Son of Man: studies contributory to a modern portrait 
1938–39 William Spence Urquhart. Humanism and Christianity1942 Leonard Hodgson, The Doctrine of the Trinity1944 John Henderson Seaforth Burleigh, The City of God; a study of St. Augustine's philosophy1948 John A. Mackay, Ephesians1948 John Mackenzie, Two Religions. A Comparative Study of Some Distinctive Ideas and Ideals in Hinduism and Christianity1949 William Dickie Niven, Reformation Principles after Four Centuries1951 George Stuart Hendry, The Gospel of the Incarnation1953 James Brown, Subject and Object in Modern Theology1954–57 George Barclay, The Ethical Vocabulary of Saint Paul1955 John Gervase Riddell, The Calling of God1960 James Stevenson McEwen, The Faith of John Knox1960–61 Martin Andrew Simpson, Defender of the Faith, etcetera  Elizabeth of England, her Church and Parliament, 1558–59 
1965 David Haxton Carswell Read, Christian Ethics1967, William Neil, The Apostolic Age, published as The Truth about the Early Church1970 James Barr, The Bible in the Modern World1972 Matthew Black, A Survey of Christological Thought, 1872-19721980 T. E. Pollard, Fullness of Humanity: Christ's Humanness and Ours1983 D. W. D. (Bill) Shaw
1987 David S. M. Hamilton, Through the Waters: Baptism and the Christian life2005 John Barton, The Nature of Biblical Criticism2011 Bruce Lindley McCormack, Abandoned by God: The Death of Christ in Systematic, Historical and Exegetical PerspectiveEdinburgh Spring 2011 announcement (PDF) 
2013 Marilynne Robinson, Son of God, Son of Man2016 Linda Woodhead, Is Britain Still a Christian Country? Religion and values in the 21st century2017 Werner Jeanrond, Hope2018 Ian A. McFarland, Vere Deus, Vere Homo: Reflections on the Incarnation2019 Guy D Stiebel, There is something new under the sun''
Frances Young

Notes

British lecture series
Christian theological lectures
Religious education in the United Kingdom